Šmiklavž pri Škofji Vasi is a settlement in the City Municipality of Celje in eastern Slovenia. It lies on the northeastern outskirts of Celje, just north of Ljubečna. The area is part of the traditional region of Styria. It is now included with the rest of the municipality in the Savinja Statistical Region.

Name
The name of the settlement was changed from Šmiklavž to Šmiklavž pri Škofji vasi in 1955.

References

External links
Šmiklavž pri Škofji Vasi on Geopedia

Populated places in the City Municipality of Celje